The Nevada Sagebrush is the independent student newspaper of the University of Nevada, Reno. It was founded on October 19, 1893, as The Student Record, against the wishes of the Nevada Board of Regents. In 1910, the name was changed to The Sagebrush and then in 2004, to The Nevada Sagebrush.

The newspaper is printed every Tuesday morning, and employs about 15 Nevada students. Prior to 2004, the newspaper called itself simply the Sagebrush.
The newspaper was given an Associated Collegiate Press Pacemaker Award for work completed during the 2007–2008, 2008–2009, 2011–2012 and most recently, 2014–15, school years. It was also a finalist for a Pacemaker at the 2006, 2007 and 2015 ACP student journalism awards. It has won the best of show award at the fall 2005, 2006, 2007 and 2008 ACP national conferences in its category (weekly broadsheet at a four-year university). The website won an ACP Online Pacemaker for the first time in 2011. It was also nominated for an online ACP Pacemaker in 2008. Its new website, which launched in the fall of 2007 and was revamped in 2014, has also been recognized by the Center for Innovation in College Media for breaking news packages, podcasts, videos and general innovation and Web presence. Many of The Nevada Sagebrush's former editors go on to work and take internships at newspapers and news organizations such as The Washington Post, The Oregonian, USA Today, The Miami Herald, The Arizona Republic, and the Associated Press, as well as dozens of local newspapers around the country.

Former editors

 1893–1894: Charles Magill
 1894–1895: F.H. Saxton
 1895–1896: O.T. Williams / J. L. M. Henry
 1896–1897: G. R. Bliss 
 1897–1898: J. J. Sullivan 
 1898–1899: H. H. Dexter
 1899–1900: A. M. Smith
 1900–1901: F. A. Bonham 
 1901–1902: George Springmeyer
 1902–1903: Bernard O'Hara / J. V. Comerford 
 1903–1904: J. V. Comerford
 1904–1905: C. C. Smith / John S. Case / D.M. McDonald
 1905–1906: D. M. McDonald / John P. Arnot
 1906–1907: Silas E. Ross
 1907–1908: Elmer A. Porter / S. L. Netherton / Silas E. Ross
 1908–1909: Silas E. Ross 
 1909–1910: Stanley M. Wilton / August Holmes
 1910–1911: August Holmes / Lloyd B. Patrick
 1911–1912: Chester M. Ogden 
 1912–1913: Robert P. Farrar
 1913–1914: Robert P. Farrar
 1914–1915: Louis J. Sommers 
 1915–1916: Bourke Healey
 1916–1917: John Heard
 1917–1918: Lyle Kimmel
 1918–1919: George Hopkins
 1919–1920: R. P. Bryan
 1920–1921: John R Bryan
 1921–1922: Leslie M. Bruce
 1922–1923: John R. Ross
 1923–1924: Paul Harwood 
 1924–1925: Walker G. Matheson
 1925–1926: W. H. Buntin
 1926–1927: Ernest L. Inwood
 1927–1928: Fred M. Anderson
 1928–1929: Allen R. Crawford 
 1929–1930: James Hammond
 1930–1931: Harvey Dondero
 1931–1932: Joe Jackson
 1932–1933: Kenneth F. Johnson
 1933–1934: William F. McMenamin
 1934–1935: Forrest M. Bibb 
 1935–1936: Frank Sullivan 
 1936–1937: John Carr
 1937–1938: John Brackett
 1938–1939: Don Kinkle
 1939–1940: Clarence Heckethom
 1940–1941: Frank McCulloch
 1941–1942: Byrn Armstrong 
 1942–1943: BtlJFrlel / Jack Fleming
 1943–1944: Jack Fleming / Melba Whitaker / Betty Molignoni
 1944–1945: Betty Molignoni 
 1945–1946: Madeline Maestretti 
 1946–1947: Bill Henley / Lloyd Rogers
 1947–1948: Gene Evans
 1948–1949: Jonnie Milburn 
 1949–1950: Gene McKenna
 1950–1951: Mark Curtis
 1951–1952: Frank Johnson / Joseph Abbott
 1952–1953: Joseph Abbott
 1953–1954: Rosemary Cochran / William Eaton
 1954–1955: William Eaton / Paul Finch
 1955–1956: Paul Finch / Ken Robbins
 1956–1957: Bruce Bledsoe 
 1957–1958: Jim Joyce 
 1958–1959: Dewey Berscheid 
 1959–1960: Warren Lerude
 1960–1961: Donald O'Donnel / Marybeth Varcados / Don Graydon 
 1961–1962: Toddene Watkins 
 1962–1963: Doug Buchanan 
 1963–1964: Patricia Rogero
 1964–1965: Mike Sloan / Linda Chambers 
 1965–1966: Sig Rogich
 1966–1967: Hampton Young 
 1967–1968: George Frank
 1968–1969: Tim Countis
 1969–1970: Tom Wixon / Mike Cuno
 1970–1971: Sheila Caudle
 1971–1972: Mike Graham
 1972–1973: Buddy Frank 
 1973–1974: Kelsie Harder 
 1974–1975: Kelsie Harder
 1975–1976: Bob Anderson 
 1976–1977: Gary Jesch / Bill Becker / Laura Hinton 
 1977–1978: Laura Hinton / Steve Falcone
 1978–1979: Steve Martarano
 1979–1980: Ruth Mills
 1980–1981: K. J. Evans / John Roll 
 1981–1982: Charles Morse Jr. 
 1982–1983: Carol Zanetti
 1983–1984: Lauren Belaustegui
 1984–1985: Steve Ball 
 1985–1986: Guy Clifton  
 1986–1987: Mike Sullivan 
 1987–1988: Geoff Schumacher
 1988–1989: Bryan Allison 
 1989–1990: Kristine Kaiser
 1990–1991: Dan Hinxman
 1991–1992: Rachael Conlin 
 1992–1993: Marcel Levy
 1993–1994: Tina Crinite
 1994–1995: James Welborn / Martha Bellisle
 1996–1997: John Curtis
 1997–1998: Jace Radke
 1998–1999: Brock Radke
 1999–2000: Adrienne Rice
 2000–2001: Alexandra Crocket
 2001–2002: Benjamin Larson
 2002–2003: Jeremy Dutton
 2003–2004: Dylan Shaver
 2004–2005: Alex Newman 
 2005–2007: Annie Flanzraich 
 2007–2008: Brian Duggan 
 2008–2009: Nick Coltrain
 2009–2011: Jessica Fryman
 2011–2012: Juan López
 2012–2013: Ben Miller
 2013–2014: Megan Ortiz / Chris Boline
 2014–2015: Chris Boline
 2015–2016: Terrance Bynum
 2016–2018: Jacob Solis
 2018–2019: Madeline Purdue
 2019–2021: Olivia Ali
 2021–2022: Andrew Mendez
 2022—present: Emerson Drewes

Sections
The Nevada Sagebrush is split into five sections:
News – The news section covers both on- and off-campus news.
Sports – The sports section with a focus on the Nevada Wolf Pack.
Arts & Entertainment – The section contains reviews of movies and music and features on cultural trends.
Opinion – The editorial section.
Multimedia – The section for developing stand alone and complementary content solely for nevadasagebrush.com.

Awards
The Nevada Sagebrush won the 2007–08, 2008–09, 2011–12 and most recently, 2014–15 Pacemaker Award for student journalism.

References

External links
 
 Silver and Blue Article on The Nevada Sagebrush and its editors (archive)
 A history of the Sagebrush written during its centennial in 1993 (archive)

Publications established in 1893
Student newspapers published in Nevada
University of Nevada, Reno